The London Contemporary Dance Theatre (LCDT) was a contemporary dance company, based at The Place, founded by Robin Howard with Robert Cohan as its Artistic Director.

Founded in 1967, and strongly influenced by the ideas of American modern and postmodern dance artists Martha Graham and Merce Cunningham, the company was probably the first contemporary dance company in the UK, and played a pioneering role in developing the art form in that country.

Choreographers such as Siobhan Davies, Christopher Bannerman and Micha Bergese, worked alongside composers like Barrington Pheloung to create new works which were performed at the Sadler's Wells Theatre and toured the UK and internationally.

Well-known works created by the company include:
 Cell (1969)
 Troy Game (1974)
 Forest (1976)
 Nympheas (1976)
 Stabat Mater (1976)
 Sphinx (1977)
 Rainbow Bandit (1979)
 Run Like Thunder (1983)

LCDT won the 1975 Evening Standard Award for Outstanding Achievement In Ballet and Olivier Awards on three occasions: in 1978, 1989–1990 and 1994.

The company closed in 1994 when The Place refocused its work, creating the Richard Alston Dance Company, and developing a bigger presenting programme for the Robin Howard Dance Theatre.

London Contemporary Dance School was originally conceived to train dancers for the company, and awarded its first degree in practical dance in 1982. The School is still in operation as part of The Place.

References

External links 

 
 

Contemporary dance in London
Dance companies in the United Kingdom
Arts organizations established in 1967
Organizations disestablished in 1994
1994 disestablishments in England
1967 establishments in England